Jorge de Oliveira (born 31 May 1916) was a Brazilian sports shooter. He competed in the 50 m pistol event at the 1952 Summer Olympics.

References

External links
  

1916 births
Year of death missing
Brazilian male sport shooters
Olympic shooters of Brazil
Shooters at the 1952 Summer Olympics